Astaroth: Book of Angels Volume 1 is an album by the Jamie Saft Trio performing compositions from John Zorn's second Masada book, "The Book of Angels".

Track listing 

 "Shalmiel" - 5:25
 "Ygal" - 3:10
 "Astaroth" - 6:11
 "Ezeqeel" - 4:22
 "Ariel" - 6:29
 "Sturiel" - 5:06
 "Baal-Peor" - 7:12
 "Pursan" - 2:23
 "Lela’hel" - 9:04
 "Beleth" - 5:59

All compositions by John Zorn.

Personnel 

Greg Cohen – bass
Ben Perowsky – drums
Jamie Saft – piano

References 

2005 albums
Albums produced by John Zorn
Tzadik Records albums
Book of Angels albums
Jamie Saft albums